Avab is a town and Village Development Committee  in Bara District in the Narayani Zone of south-eastern Nepal. At the time of the 2011 Nepal census it had a population of 5,258 people living in 928 individual households. There were 2,566 males and  2,692 females at the time of census.

References

External links
UN map of the municipalities of Bara District

Populated places in Bara District